Anne Rimmer (born 1947) is a New Zealand conservationist and writer. In 2005 she won a Montana Book Award.

Biography 
Rimmer has been a guide on the open sanctuary island, Tiritiri Matangi Island, near Auckland, for over 20 years. She wrote a book about the island, Tiritiri Matangi: a model of conservation, which won a Montana Book Award in 2005.
A follow-up supplement Tiritiri Matangi 2005-2020 was self-published in 2021. Both books are available from the island's online shop.

References 

New Zealand non-fiction writers
21st-century New Zealand writers
New Zealand conservationists
1947 births
Living people